The Journal of Environmental Assessment Policy and Management is a quarterly peer-reviewed academic journal covering policy and decision-making relating to environmental assessment in the broadest sense. The focus of the journal is on policy, procedures and law covering project and policy formulation, development and implementation, public participation, and the institutional basis for environmental assessment. The journal was established in 1999 and is published by World Scientific Publishing. The editor-in-chief is Farhad Taghizadeh-Hesary (Tokai University).

Abstracting and indexing 
The journal is abstracted and indexed in:
 Academic OneFile
 Biological Abstracts
 BIOSIS Previews
 CAB Abstracts
 CSA Human Population and the Environment Abstracts
 CSA Meteorological & Geoastrophysical Abstracts
 CSA Pollution Abstracts
 CSA Selected Water Resources Abstracts
 CSA Toxicology Abstracts
 EBSCO databases
 Geobase
 International Bibliography of the Social Sciences
 ProQuest databases
 RePEC
 Scopus

References

External links 
 

English-language journals
Publications established in 1999
Environmental social science journals
World Scientific academic journals
Quarterly journals